Stanniocalcin-2 is a protein that in humans is encoded by the STC2 gene.

This gene encodes a secreted, homodimeric glycoprotein that is expressed in a wide variety of tissues and may have autocrine or paracrine functions. The encoded protein has 10 of its 15 cysteine residues conserved among stanniocalcin family members and is phosphorylated by casein kinase 2 exclusively on its serine residues. 

Its C-terminus contains a cluster of histidine residues which may interact with metal ions. The protein may play a role in the regulation of renal and intestinal calcium and phosphate transport, cell metabolism, or cellular calcium/phosphate homeostasis. Constitutive overexpression of human stanniocalcin 2 in mice resulted in pre- and postnatal growth restriction, reduced bone and skeletal muscle growth, and organomegaly. Expression of this gene is induced by estrogen and altered in some breast cancers.

Stanniocalcin reduces bone growth by modulating the activity of IGF1. One mechanism of IGF1 regulation is through IGFBP4 binding it in an inactive state. The protease PAPPA can then cleave this complex, releasing bioactive IGF1. Stanniocalcin inhibits the activity of PAPPA in releasing active IGF1 through itself binding PAPPA, thus preventing the release of active IGF1.

Differences in stanniocalcin expression have been directly linked to changes in skeletal size in a variety of species. For example, laboratory mice lacking STC2 are 10 to 15% larger than wild-type mice, while mice expressing STC2 at elevated levels are 45% smaller. In humans, the largest known coding variant affecting human height is a rare mutation reducing STC2 activity, yielding a 2 cm height increase in heterozygous carriers. Additionally, domestic dog size is strongly predicted by a variant immediately adjacent to STC2, with almost all small dogs carrying a derived allele at this locus. A further striking example is the stickleback, different populations of which have either increased or decreased the length of their dorsal and pelvic spines through modulation of STC2 expression.

References

Further reading